The Composite Engineering BQM-167 Skeeter is a subscale aerial target (drone) developed and manufactured by Composite Engineering Inc. (acquired by Kratos Defense & Security Solutions) and operated by the United States Air Force and certain international customer air forces (designation BQM-167i). It replaced the Beechcraft MQM-107 Streaker.

Design and development
The BQM-167 was developed and manufactured by Composite Engineering Inc. (now part of Kratos Defense & Security Solutions), and is constructed of carbon fiber and epoxy-based materials. 
 
Two prototype targets were built and test flown in 2001. The BQM-167A was selected as the next-generation Air Force subscale aerial target in July 2002. A total of six targets were built for use during the flight performance demonstration (FPD) phase with its first flight 8 December 2004. A total of 13 FPD launches were made into March 2006.

First acceptance testing was completed in August 2006, then pre-operational testing consisted of 13 test flights using production targets from August 2006 - June 2007. The first BQM-167 air-to-air missile live-fire mission took place 7 February 2007. Initial Operational Capability was achieved in 2008. Each target cost US$570,000.

Operational history

The 82nd Aerial Targets Squadron operates and maintains the target at Tyndall Air Force Base, Florida.
 
The drone is land-launched using a rocket assisted takeoff and launched from a rail system, and recovered on land or sea using a parachute system. After assessment and refurbishment, the drone is placed back into service.
 
The USAF has had 37 in inventory.

On 19 March 2021, a BQM-167 washed ashore in Boynton Beach, Florida after a weapon systems evaluation.

Variants

UTAP-22 Mako

On 23 November 2015, Kratos completed the second flight of its self-funded Unmanned Tactical Aerial Platform (UTAP-22), a development of the BQM-167A converted into a low-cost unmanned combat aerial vehicle (UCAV). The test involved collaborative airborne operations with a manned AV-8B Harrier fighter for 94 minutes demonstrating command and control through a tactical data-link, autonomous formation flying with the AV-8B, and transfer of UTAP-22 control between operators in a tactical network and then to an independent control link. It can carry a  internal payload, a  external payload, and has a -capable weapon hardpoint on each wing. The platform is recoverable on land or at sea using a parachute system. In May 2017, the UTAP-22 received the official name Mako. The aircraft costs between $2-$3 million.

Operators

 United States Air Force
.
Singapore
 Republic Of Singapore Air Force

Specifications

References

External links

 Kratos BQM-167 page
 Kratos UTAP-22 Mako page

Target drones of the United States
Decoy missiles of the United States
Single-engined jet aircraft
Low-wing aircraft